Brickellia oliganthes is a Mesoamerican species of flowering plants in the family Asteraceae. It is widespread from northern Mexico (Tamaulipas, Nuevo León, Durango, Sinaloa) south as far as Honduras.

References

External links
Photo of herbarium specimen collected in Michoacán

oliganthes
Flora of Mexico
Flora of Central America
Plants described in 1830